Camrose is the name of an electoral ward in Pembrokeshire, Wales. Since May 2022 the ward has been coterminous the community of Camrose. The community of Camrose consists of part of Pembrokeshire Coast National Park

According to the UK 2011 Census the population of the Camrose ward was 2,565 (with 2,148 of these of voting age).

Camrose councillor Jamie Adams was leader of Pembrokeshire County Council from May 2012 until the May 2017 elections.

History
A ward of Pembrokeshire County Council since 1995 Camrose was previously a ward of the former Preseli Pembrokeshire District Council.

Until the 2022 local elections the ward also covered the community of Nolton and Roch. Following the recommendations of a boundary review by the Local Government Boundary Commission for Wales, the ward was reconfigured, with Nolton and Roch being transferred and merged with the neighbouring ward of The Havens.

County elections
At the first election for the new Pembrokeshire County Council in 1995, an Independent, previously a member of Preseli Pembrokeshire District Council was elected.

At the second election, in 1999 the Conservative Party fielded candidates in Pembrokeshire for the first time but they were heavily defeated in Camrose.

At the third election, in 2004 Desmond Codd stood down and Jamie Adams was elected in a four cornered contest.

Adams was returned unopposed in 2008.

In 2012, Adams was again returned unopposed.

At the May 2017 elections Adams was elected again after another four cornered contest.

* = sitting councillor prior to the election

References

Pembrokeshire electoral wards